Christopher Dow (born June 17, 1950) is an American writer. He is the author of three volumes of poetry, four novels, a collection of essays and a theoretical book on the martial art of t'ai chi ch'uan. A practitioner of t'ai chi for more than 30 years, Dow has written articles on these subjects that have appeared in Tai Chi Magazine, Inside Kung Fu and Yoga Journal. He also wrote, directed and produced several video productions, including a documentary series on the first nationally sanctioned kung fu tournament in the United States, the U.S. National Chinese Martial Arts Competition.

Dow was the publisher and a founding editor of Phosphene Magazine, a quarterly literary magazine in the Houston area from 1978 to 1981 that featured fiction, poetry, essays, graphic art and photographs, and Dialog Magazine, a bimonthly urban tabloid in Houston from 1983 to 1984 that featured articles, essays, reviews, features, fiction, poetry, graphic art and photographs.

Dow is currently the editor of Rice Magazine (formerly Sallyport), the magazine of Rice University in Houston. His work has been recognized with awards from the Houston Advertising Federation, the Public Relations Society of America and the Council for Advancement and Support of Education. His awards for writing, editing and video also include a Silver Award for Historical Documentary from the Houston International Film Festival.

Works
Nonfiction
 The Wellspring 2008
 Lord of the Loincloth 2007
 Book of Curiosities

Poetry
 City of Dreams 2010 
 The Trip Out 2010
 Texas White Line Fever

Fiction
 Devil of a Time 2009
 Roadkill 2009
 The Dead Detective 2008
 The Werewolf and Tide and Other Compulsions

Editor
 The Best of Phosphene
 The Best of Dialog

References

External links
 http://www.phosphenepublishing.com

1950 births
Living people
21st-century American novelists
Novelists from Texas
American martial arts writers
21st-century American poets
American male novelists
American male essayists
American male poets
21st-century American essayists
21st-century American male writers